Luciano Henrique de Gouveia (born October 10, 1978 in Tremembé) is a Brazilian football striker who currently plays for Santo André.

He played domestically for Taubaté, Juventus, Guaratinguetá, Atlético Sorocaba, Santos, Sport Recife, Internacional, São Caetano, Fortaleza, Paysandu, Santa Cruz and Santo André, and had a loan spell with South Korean club Pohang Steelers.

Honours 
 Campeonato Pernambucano in 2007 and 2008 with Sport Club do Recife
 Copa do Brasil in 2008 with Sport Club do Recife

References

CBF Profile 
Sport Club do Recife Official Site 
meusport.com 
terra 

1978 births
Living people
Association football forwards
Brazilian footballers
Brazilian expatriate footballers
Esporte Clube Taubaté players
Clube Atlético Juventus players
Guaratinguetá Futebol players
Clube Atlético Sorocaba players
Santos FC players
Pohang Steelers players
Sport Club do Recife players
Sport Club Internacional players
Fortaleza Esporte Clube players
Paysandu Sport Club players
Santa Cruz Futebol Clube players
Esporte Clube Santo André players
K League 1 players
Expatriate footballers in South Korea
Footballers from São Paulo (state)
Brazilian expatriate sportspeople in South Korea